Universités nouvelles (French for "new universities") are eight unaffiliated  universities in France that were created during the 1990s.

History 
In the 1990s, the head of the Ministry of Higher Education and Research, Lionel Jospin, launched the plan université 2000 (university project 2000), with a spatial planning target: at the time French institutions of higher education were having to address an influx of 50,000 to 100,000 additional students per year. It was especially important to relieve pressure on the universities of Paris and Lille.

These new universities were created either from existing out-stations of the older universities, or else by programs specifically planned to establish new ones. The four new universities located in Ile-de-France were created by decree on 22 July 1991, those of Artois and Littoral by decree on 7 November 1991 the one of La Rochelle in 1993, and that of South Brittany in 1995.

The Montesquieu University – Bordeaux IV, created in 1995 by the subdivision of the existing University of Bordeaux I, and the University of Nîmes, created in 2007, are not considered part of this group.

List of universities

Close to Paris 
 Cergy-Pontoise University
 University of Évry Val d'Essonne
 University of Marne la Vallée
 Versailles Saint-Quentin-en-Yvelines University

North 
 Artois University
 University of the Littoral Opal Coast

Atlantic 
 University of La Rochelle
 University of Southern Brittany

See also
 New university

References

External links 
 Official website